Estadio Municipal La Cocha is a multi-use stadium in Latacunga, Ecuador.  It is currently used mostly for football matches and is the home stadium of Club Deportivo Universidad Técnica de Cotopaxi of the Serie B de Ecuador, and of Club Social y Deportivo Cotopaxi and Sociedad Deportiva Flamengo of the Segunda Categoría.  The stadium holds 15,200 spectators and opened on 1 April 1982.

References

External links
Stadium information 

La Cocha
Buildings and structures in Cotopaxi Province